Suomi means Finland in Finnish. 

Suomi may also refer to:

Finnish language
Suomi (surname)
Suomi, Minnesota, an unincorporated community
Suomi College, in Hancock, Michigan, now referred to as Finlandia University
Suomi Island, Western Australia, Australia
Suomi KP/-31, a Finnish submachine gun
Suomi NPP, a weather satellite 
1656 Suomi, a Mars-crossing asteroid

See also

Suomalaiset, the name of the Finnish people
Suomirokki, Finnish rock music
Suomisaundi, a style of freeform psychedelic trance music originating from Finland
Suomy, an Italian brand of motorcycle helmets